WR 128 is a Wolf–Rayet star located about 9,500 light years away in the constellation of Sagitta. A member of the WN class, WR 128's spectrum resembles that of a WN4 star, but hydrogen is clearly present in the star (hence the h in its spectrum), making it the only known hydrogen-rich WN4 star in the galaxy. However, similar H-rich very early WN stars can be found in the LMC and especially in the SMC, but the only other galactic examples of this are WR 3 and WR 152.

Properties 
Analysis of WR 128's spectrum with PoWR shows that it has a temperature of around 70,800 K and is losing mass at a very slow pace (in Wolf-Rayet terms), at 10-5.4 M☉/year, or in other words, 1 solar mass every 250,000 years. All this mass is being carried by a very strong stellar wind with a terminal velocity of 2,050 kilometres per second. Using the Stefan-Boltzmann Law, we can calculate a radius of 2.69 R☉. A "transformed" radius at an optical depth of 2/3, more comparable to other types of stars, is at about 13 R☉.

References

Wolf–Rayet stars
Sagitta (constellation)
Sagittae, QT
097456
187282